The Gustave Bartman House in southeast Portland in the U.S. state of Oregon is a two-and-a-half-story dwelling listed on the National Register of Historic Places. A Queen Anne structure built in 1892, it was added to the register in 1989. Bartman, a contractor, may have built the house.

The interior of the house consists of two essentially identical apartments, one on each floor. Designed during the Victorian era, the structure is a well-preserved example of a southeast Portland duplex. It was built just one year after the city of East Portland became part of the growing city of Portland. Notable features include a full-height window bay, imbricated shingles, and a double veranda.

See also
 National Register of Historic Places listings in Southeast Portland, Oregon

References

External links
 

1892 establishments in Oregon
Hosford-Abernethy, Portland, Oregon
Houses completed in 1892
Houses on the National Register of Historic Places in Portland, Oregon
Portland Eastside MPS
Queen Anne architecture in Oregon
National Register of Historic Places in Multnomah County, Oregon
Portland Historic Landmarks